The 2015 Discovery Women’s Basketball Invitational was an invitational basketball tournament which was contested by the women's national teams of the Philippines, Turkmenistan, and Team A and B of Papua New Guinea. The games took place in Davao City at the Almendras Gym Davao City Recreation Center.

Results

Preliminary round

Third place play-off

Finals

Awards 
The Philippines won their third title winning against Papua New Guinea A team in the finals. Turkmenistan placed third while Papua New Guinea B placed fourth.

References

Discovery Women's Basketball Invitational
2014–15 in Philippine basketball
2014–15 in Asian basketball
2015 in women's basketball
Bask